Thomas Memory Turner (July 17, 1847 – September 2, 1917) was an American composer, band leader, and music professor. He was known to his friends as "Mem".

He was once assistant director of the Stonewall Brigade Band of Staunton, Virginia, the United States's oldest continuous community band sponsored by local government and funded, in part, by tax monies. His father A. J. Turner was director. Memory trained several cornet bands, and  spent several years directing the band at the Western Lunatic Asylum.

Early years in Staunton
Thomas Memory Turner was born on July 17, 1847, in Middletown, Virginia to A. J. Turner and Kate Aby, and moved to Staunton with them in the mid to late 1850s.

Civil War
Turner served in the Confederacy for much of the American Civil War. His father A. J. was a band leader in the Stonewall Brigade Band in the Stonewall Brigade. Thomas Memory was a musician alongside his father in the 5th Virginia Infantry from April 1 to August 22, 1862, playing the cornet. He was later in the 14th Virginia Cavalry band, enlisting at Brandy Station on August 1, 1863. He was taken prisoner and paroled on April 30, 1865, in Winchester, at the age of 17.

Stonewall Brigade Band
The Stonewall Brigade Band was reorganized in 1869 with Turner as assistant leader and his father as leader.

First marriage
Turner married Kate Grimes of Maryland, daughter of Dr. Gassaway Sellman Grimes, on February 28, 1872, in Warren County, Virginia. They were married by Rev. Amasa Converse, the man who married Edgar Allan Poe and Virginia Eliza Clemm Poe.  A daughter, Susan Dorsey Turner, was born there in 1874. Turner instructed the Charlestown Cornet Band in 1874 and 1875.

Lewisburg
Turner lived in Lewisburg, West Virginia from 1876 until November 1879. A son, Charles Augustus Turner, was born there.  Turner directed the Lewisburg Concert Band. His sister Cora would sing for them. He also was a jeweler and watchmaker.

Return to Staunton
Turner returns to Staunton in November 1879, and lived on 12 Madison Street.  He continued to play in the Stonewall Brigade Band. He directed the "Stonewall Octette", a group of singers attached to the band.

At a rally for Hancock and English just before the election of 1880, Turner composed "Hancock's Grand March". After the assassination of President Garfield, Turner also composed a dirge, "Garfield's Funeral March".

Watchmaker
Turner ran a jewelry store in Olivier's Bookstore on 102 E. Beverley Street (also known as Main Street) now a part of the historic district. Turner fixed watches and jewelry as well as offered his services tuning instruments.

Return to Lewisburg
Turner again instructs a band in Lewisburg in 1884, and is living there by 1889, living at Alderson and Hinton in between. His wife Kate dies in Alderson on October 14, 1888. His son Claude died in Lewisburg, on September 5, 1889, at the age of just 14, falling headforemost into a vat of boiling water at the Greenbrier Cannery. Both Kate and Claude are buried at the Old Stone Church.

Second Return to Staunton
After the death of his wife and son, Turner again returned to Staunton, and lived at 213 W. Beverley St.

Western Lunatic Asylum
He became director of the Blackford Cornet Band of the Western Lunatic Asylum, a ten or eleven piece band composed of the male attendants. He was paid $6 a week and an extra $3 if he tuned the pianos.

One account reads "The music of the Hospital Band sets aside solitude and relieves the monotony of asylum life, and has a wonderful effects in quieting the noisy and disturbed patients, besides being a source of great pleasure and enjoyment to the more quiet class, and is greatly enjoyed by visitors to the institution."

Second marriage

On February 15, 1893, he married Virginia Ann "Nannie" Wyatt at Harrisonburg, Virginia, at the residence of Hubert or Herbert Coffman. They were married by C. R. Cruikshank. She died March 9, 1894, in Staunton.

Maryland
From 1896 to 1897 Turner was in Baltimore and Gaithersburg. In Gaithersburg, he taught a band, and attended a reunion of the Central Brass Band, which he had instructed.

Norfolk
Turner settled in Norfolk late in life, where he taught music. He died there September 2, 1917.

References

Bibliography

External links

1847 births
1917 deaths
Stonewall Brigade
American male composers
American composers
People from Staunton, Virginia
Musicians from Norfolk, Virginia
Confederate States Army personnel
American watchmakers (people)
People from Lewisburg, West Virginia
American bandleaders
People of Virginia in the American Civil War